Geometry Expert (GEX) is a Chinese software package for dynamic diagram drawing and automated geometry theorem proving and discovering. 

There's a new Chinese version of Geometry Expert, called MMP/Geometer.

Java Geometry Expert is free under GNU General Public License.

External links
 GEX Official website
 Java GEX (old, new) on Wichita State University
 Java GEX Documentation on Wichita State University

Theorem proving software systems
Automated theorem proving
Interactive geometry software